Jung Min-joo (born Jung A-rin, October 11, 1990), known professionally as Joo (stylized in all caps), is a South Korean singer, songwriter and musical actress. In 2006, she became a contestant on JYP Entertainment's Superstar Survival. Although she didn't win, she was accepted as a trainee at JYP Entertainment. After two years of training, Joo debuted as a soloist with her single album Young Girl in January 2008. However, she resumed training for two years, as she didn't feel ready for her debut. Joo later returned in January 2011 by releasing her EP Heartmade.

Aside from her music career, Joo has participated in various musical dramas, including Youthful March (2011–2012), Catch Me If You Can (2012–2013), and Full House (2014). She also participated in notable TV drama Dream High (2011) and the movie Marriage Blue (2013).

Early life
Joo was born on October 11, 1990 in Seoul, South Korea. She spent her childhood in Indonesia because of her father's work. Her younger brother is Jung Il-hoon, a former member of the South Korean boy group BtoB.

Career

Pre-debut
Joo was one of the contestants in the 2006 survival series Superstar Survival alongside 2PM's Chansung, Taecyeon and Junho. Although Junho was ultimately crowned the winner, she was accepted to train at JYP Entertainment.

2008: Young Girl and return to trainee
On January 10, 2008, JYP Entertainment stated that they would debut a new solo singer, Joo. She made her debut stage on January 11, 2008, with her single "Young Girl" on KBS' Music Bank. Despite already making her debut, Joo ultimately decided that she was not yet ready to finish her training. She continued life as a trainee until her comeback in 2011.

2011–2014:  Heartmade and musical acting
On January 3, 2011, Joo released her much-awaited comeback video, titled "Bad Guy", which featured 2PM's Chansung on her official YouTube channel. The single was part of her album titled Heartmade. Her comeback stage featured the same song on the January 7 broadcast of Music Bank.

On May 12, 2011, Joo released another teaser video with a new song titled "Ice Cream" featuring Super Junior's leader, Leeteuk. The music video was released on May 16, 2011. 
 
On May 23, 2011, JYP Entertainment officially announced that JYP artists would come together for two “JYP NATION in Japan 2011” concerts in Japan in August 2011. The star-studded line-up included Park Jin-young, Lim Jeong-hee, Wonder Girls, Joo, 2AM, 2PM, Miss A, and San E. The two concerts took place on August 17 and 18 at the Saitama Super Arena.

On October 10, 2011, JYP Entertainment revealed that Joo had been selected as a leading actress in a musical called Youthful March, scheduled to perform from November 12, 2011 to January 29, 2012. This marked her debut as a musical actress. As it was her first time in a musical, she said: "I'm excited to take my first step into the world of musicals. It's only the beginning, and as it is a leading role, I'll be rehearsing harder than anyone else to create an amazing show.  I'll do my best to show a different image from singer Joo as musical actress Joo, so please give me your support.".

On October 31, 2012, JYP Entertainment announced that Joo had been selected to take on the role of Brenda in the new musical of Catch Me If You Can scheduled to have its first performance on December 14, 2012 and final on February 9, 2013. Other prominent stars such as Girls' Generation's Sunny, CSJH The Grace's Dana and Oh Sang-eun have taken turns to take on the role previously.

On March 5, 2014, it was announced that Joo was selected to join Beast's Yoseob in the musical remake of Full House, which ran from April 11, 2014 to June 8, 2014. She joined the cast of Full House, which included VIXX's Leo, A Pink's Jung Eun-ji, Kim San-ho, Seo Ha-joon, and Kwak Sun-young.

Through an interview, she shared her thoughts and experiences on living as a musical actress, which is a career quite different than the one in her past. She said: "I've been enjoying performing for the musical Full House. I've been watching other musicals and taking lessons on my days off." She also revealed her hopes of wanting people who come to watch Full House to see her as Han Ji-eun, not as singer Joo or actress Jung Min-joo.

2015–present: Cry & Blow, Late in the Morning, The Unit
In January 2015, Joo's contract with JYP Entertainment ended. In April, it was revealed that she had signed an exclusive contract with Woollim Entertainment.

In October 2015, Woollim Entertainment confirmed Joo would be making a comeback after five years, releasing a ballad track. Joo released her single, Cry & Blow, on November 2.

Joo release her second digital single Late in the Morning on May 26, 2017. The ballad track was composed by Nell's Lee Junghoon.

On October 2, 2017 Joo confirmed she would be appearing on reality television series The Unit and participated in a recording for the program on October 1, which aired on October 28.

Personal life 
Joo married her non-celebrity boyfriend on May 4th 2019 after dating for a year.  Her younger brother, BTOB’s Jung Il-hoon, was in attendance, as were his fellow members Yook Sung-jae, Im Hyun-sik (singer), and Peniel Shin. The group reportedly performed “Only One For Me” as the congratulatory song.

Discography

EPs

Single album

Singles

Soundtrack appearances

Other charted songs

Filmography

Film

Television series

Musical theatre

Music video appearances

Awards

References

External links 
 artists_profile_joo.wol

1990 births
Living people
JYP Entertainment artists
K-pop singers
South Korean dance musicians
South Korean female idols
South Korean women pop singers
South Korean film actresses
South Korean television actresses
South Korean television personalities
Woollim Entertainment artists
Singers from Seoul
21st-century South Korean singers
21st-century South Korean women singers